Isoperla claudiae is an aquatic species of perlodid stonefly endemic to the Southern Limestone Alps.

Etymology
The species was named after co-author Martin Konar's wife Claudia.

Description
Adults measure 10.5–11 millimeters long, with 12–14 mm long forewings.  General body coloration is yellow, with a horseshoe-shaped mark on the head connecting the three ocelli.  Legs are brown.

Mature larvae are 13 mm long with a rectangular pronotum.  Coloration is brown with two yellow spots on the head.

Range and habitat
Isoperla claudiae is aquatic and is usually found in mountain brooks.

The species is found in the Karawanks and the Kamnik–Savinja Alps in Austria and Slovenia.

References

Perlodidae